Malvern School District, also known as Malvern Special School District (MSSD), is a school district based in Malvern, Arkansas, United States. The district serves more than 2,100 students in childhood, elementary, and secondary education in kindergarten through grade 12. 

Malvern School District encompasses  of land, in Hot Spring, Cleveland, and Dallas counties.

Within Hot Spring County it serves Malvern, Perla, almost all of Rockport, and a portion of Midway. Within Dallas County it serves Carthage.

History 
In May 2004, the former Carthage School District was consolidated with the Malvern School District.

Schools 
Elementary education:
 Malvern Elementary School, serving kindergarten through grade 4.
 Wilson Intermediate School, serving grades 5 and 6.

Secondary education:
 Malvern Middle School, serving grades 7 and 8.
 Malvern High School, serving grades 9 through 12.

References

Further reading
Maps of the Malvern district:
  (Download)
  (Download)

External links
 
 

Education in Cleveland County, Arkansas
Education in Dallas County, Arkansas
Education in Hot Spring County, Arkansas
School districts in Arkansas
Malvern, Arkansas